In both the World Reference Base for Soil Resources (WRB) and the USDA soil taxonomy, a Histosol is a soil consisting primarily of organic materials. They are defined as having  or more of organic soil material in the upper . Organic soil material has an organic carbon content (by weight) of 12 to 18 percent, or more, depending on the clay content of the soil. These materials include muck (sapric soil material), mucky peat (hemic soil material), or peat (fibric soil material). Aquic conditions or artificial drainage are required. Typically, Histosols have very low bulk density and are poorly drained because the organic matter holds water very well. Most are acidic and many are very deficient in major plant nutrients which are washed away in the consistently moist soil.

Histosols are known by various other names in other countries, such as peat or muck. In the Australian Soil Classification, Histosols are called Organosols.

Histosols form whenever organic matter forms at a more rapid rate than it is destroyed. This occurs because of restricted drainage precluding aerobic decomposition, and the remains of plants and animals remain within the soil. Thus, Histosols are very important ecologically because they, and Gelisols, store large quantities of organic carbon. If accumulation continues for a long enough period, coal forms.

Most Histosols occur in Canada, Scandinavia, the West Siberian Plain, Sumatra, Borneo and New Guinea. Smaller areas are found in other parts of Europe, the Russian Far East (chiefly in Khabarovsk Krai and Amur Oblast), Florida and other areas of permanent swampland. Fossil Histosols are known from the earliest extensive land vegetation in the Devonian.

Histosols are generally very difficult to cultivate because of the poor drainage and often low chemical fertility. However, Histosols formed on very recent glacial lands can often be very productive when drained and produce high-grade pasture for dairying or beef cattle. They can sometimes be used for fruit if carefully managed, but there is a great risk of the organic matter becoming dry powder and eroding under the influence of drying winds. A tendency towards shrinkage and compaction is also evident with crops.

Like Gelisols, Histosols have greatly restricted use for civil engineering purposes because heavy structures tend to subside in the wet soil.

In USDA soil taxonomy, Histosols are subdivided into:
 Folists – Histosols that are not saturated with water for long periods of time during the year.
 Fibrists – Histosols that are primarily made up of only slightly decomposed organic materials, often called peat.
 Hemists – Histosols that are primarily made up of moderately decomposed organic materials.
 Saprists – Histosols that are primarily made up of highly decomposed organic materials, often called muck.
 Wassists - Histosols that have a field observable water table 2 cm or more above the soil surface for more than 21 hours of each day in all years.

See also
Acid sulfate soil
Hydric soil
Pedogenesis
Pedology (soil study)
Soil classification
Soil type

References 

 
 
 IUSS Working Group WRB: World Reference Base for Soil Resources, fourth edition. International Union of Soil Sciences, Vienna 2022. .

Further reading
 W. Zech, P. Schad, G. Hintermaier-Erhard: Soils of the World. Springer, Berlin 2022, Chapter 3.3.1.

External links 
 profile photos (with classification) WRB homepage
 profile photos (with classification) IUSS World of Soils

Pedology
Types of soil